Hesar (also Romanized as Ḩeşār; also known as Ashahr) is a village in Duzaj Rural District, Kharqan District, Zarandieh County, Markazi Province, Iran. At the 2006 census, its population was 65, in 23 families.

References 

Populated places in Zarandieh County